The Tuffbach, also known locally as the Weissbach, is a river of Tyrol, Austria, a tributary of the Inn.

The Tuffbach lies entirely within the municipal territory of Innsbruck.

A small hotel has built a power plant there and uses the electricity generated for domestic requirements. Around the basin are canals, which divert the water in case of emergency.

Another feature is the high water speed near the mouth (~).

The water is usually of grade B quality.

References 

Rivers of Tyrol (state)
Rivers of Austria